Vice Admiral William Goodsonn (1610in or after 1680), also William Goodson, was an English naval officer.

Early career
William Goodsonn joined the Parliamentary cause during the Second English Civil War in 1647. During the First Anglo-Dutch War he was captain of the Entrance in the battle of Portland, 25 January 1663. He was a rear-admiral of the blue in the battles of June and July 1653. In the Anglo-Spanish War, he was vice-admiral under William Penn in 1654, and with him at attempt on Hispaniola, and capture of Jamaica in 1655. He took over command of the Jamaica Station after Penn went home.

Goodsonn also took part in the Battle of the Dunes in 1658 (bombardment of the Spanish army by the English Navy to support the Anglo–French army).

Operations in the Sound
In November 1658 Goodsonn was appointed Commander of the English Baltic Fleet that instructed to transport General at Sea Sir George Ayscue who was being loaned to Sweden to assist in their naval operations against Denmark and the Dutch.

In the autumn of 1658 a Dutch fleet commanded by Jacob van Wassenaer Obdam defeated the Swedes in the Battle of the Sound, and lifted the blockade of Copenhagen. To protect English interests, on 13th November 1658 the Commonwealth Protector Richard Cromwell ordered a fleet to be sent to the Sound. The ships in Goodsonn’s fleet that conducted operations in the Sound were Swiftsure, Speaker, Plymouth, Newbury, Gloucester, Bridgewater, Essex, Newcastle, Ruby, Centurion, Nantwich, Preston, Adventure, Assurance, Maidstone, Expedition, Fagons, Forester, Elias, and Hind. The fleet of 20 ships, with Goodsonn in command as Vice-Admiral. was only half the size of the Dutch. It was sent as a political gesture to dissuade the Dutch from sending a second fleet to the Baltic. 

All the fleet apart from Essex, Maidstone, and Expedition sailed from the Downs on 17 November, and the expedition left the Thames the following day. Goodsonn left Aldborough Bay on 18th November, but after three days he was forced back to port by strong winds. On 3 December the fleet sailed again, and in six days it reached the Skaw. Most of the fleet was prevented from rounding the Skaw by continuous winds. 

On 15 December, having accomplished little, Goodsonn decided to return home. That night the wind became a gale. The Bridgewater ran into the stern of the Swiftsure, Goodsonn's flagship, and lost her bowsprit, foremast, and mainmast. The Preston lost her bowsprit, foremast, and main topmast, the Ruby sprung her mainmast and bowsprit, and nearly every ship was damaged. None was lost, and from 22 December until the end of the year they anchored on the English coast between Great Yarmouth and Harwich.

At the end of March 1959, Mountagu set out for the Baltic with a new fleet of 40 ships, with Goodsonn and Sir Richard Stayner as his deputies. On 16 May, following the collapse of Richard Cromwell’s government, fresh orders told Mountagu not to attack.

References

Sources

Further reading

1610 births
Roundheads

Year of death missing
Royal Navy personnel of the First Anglo-Dutch War
Royal Navy vice admirals